Kevin Ryan Siegrist (born July 20, 1989) is an American professional baseball pitcher for the Charleston Dirty Birds of the Atlantic League of Professional Baseball. He was drafted by the St. Louis Cardinals in 2008 from Palm Beach State College in Lake Worth, Florida.

After spending a significant amount of time as a starting pitcher, Siegrist converted to relief full-time for 2013. In May, he earned recognition as the Cardinals Pitcher of the Month. He made his MLB debut the next month after spending five years in the minor leagues. For his rookie year, Siegrist posted a 0.45 earned run average (ERA) in  innings pitched (IP), striking out 50.

Education
After graduating from Wellington High School in Wellington, Florida, he attended Palm Beach State College, where he was a walk-on with the "Panthers" baseball team. Siegrist was discovered purely by accident when a scout attending a Palm Beach State game to watch another player took notice of Siegrist's performance.

Professional career

St. Louis Cardinals
The Cardinals selected Siegrist in the 41st round of the 2008 MLB draft as the 1,235th player taken out of 1,504 total. He spent the summer playing for the Gulf Coast League Cardinals. In 2009, he pitched for the Batavia Muckdogs, then a Cardinals affiliate in the New York–Penn League. He appeared in ten games for Batavia, making one start and earning a victory while posting an overall season 3.86 ERA. The next season, 2010, was split between Batavia and the Johnson City Cardinals. Siegrist made a combined 14 starts between the two teams, finishing with a season ERA of 4.02 and a 4–4 overall record.

Siegrist again split time among two Cardinals minor league teams in 2011. He began the season in the Class A Midwest League with the Quad Cities River Bandits starting nine games, winning eight of them, and posting a low 1.15 ERA. He was the Topps' Midwest League Player of Month in May. Siegrist fared less well after promotion to the Palm Beach Cardinals back near his Florida home, going 0–3 in eleven games as his ERA jumped to 3.42. However, he did log the most innings pitched, 107, of any point yet in his career. Persistent injuries, consisting of back pain and shoulder soreness, in part, slowed his progress.

Another year, another split season as Siegrist spent 2012 with Palm Beach before advancing to the Double-A Springfield Cardinals. A combined 7–2 record between the two teams, including 6–0 with Palm Beach, and 68 strikeouts over 87 IP caught the attention of officials with main club as the St. Louis Cardinals added Siegrist to their 40-man roster after the 2012 season.

Siegrist started 2013 again with the Springfield Cardinals but the organization began to take a different strategy. Instead of grooming him to be a starter, the Cardinals predicted he would have a velocity increase as a full-time reliever, and as a left-hander, could serve as a valuable late-inning strategic piece. He quickly moved up to the Triple-A Memphis Redbirds of the Pacific Coast League, where he spent just  IP after four years between the Rookie and A levels. Siegrist was named the Cardinals Minor League Pitcher of the Month in May. He posted an ERA of 1.95 and a record of 2–1 in 18 relief appearances combined at Springfield and Memphis. In  IP, he allowed just 11 hits with 10 bases on balls (BB) for a walks plus hits per inning pitched ratio (WHIP) of 0.759. In addition, he registered 44 SO for a ratio of 14.3 strikeouts per 9 innings pitched (K/9).

The Cardinals promoted Siegrist from Memphis to the major leagues on June 6, 2013. He made his major league debut the same night as he took the mound in the 7th inning in relief of Shelby Miller in a game against the Arizona Diamondbacks at Busch Stadium. Siegrist struck out four while allowing one hit in one and two-thirds inning of work. As of his debut, 51 players from the 2008 MLB Draft had been on a major league roster, or 3.4%. Siegrist had also been just one of eight drafted in the 40th round or later that on a major league roster.

Siegrist proved difficult for Major League hitters as allowed a .128 batting average against (BAA); against left-handed hitters it was .118, and .138 against right-handers. For the season, he pitched  innings while allowing a team-low 0.45 ERA for all with at least at many innings pitched as he. With 50 SO, his K/9 ratio was 11.3. In the World Series against the Boston Red Sox, he yielded a home run to David Ortiz, the Series MVP, but did not factor in the decision in that game. The Cardinals lost in six games.

After suffering a forearm injury early in 2014, his BAA increased to .267. He was far less effective, allowing 23 earned runs in  IP − he had allowed just two runs in all of 2013. His ERA was 6.82, and he also allowed 32 hits and 16 walks. In 2015, Siegrist became the primary setup man for closer Trevor Rosenthal. He started off with much dramatically improved results, due in part to restored fastball velocity. He also increased his pitch efficiency, which started at 17.12 in 2013 and increased to 19.2 in 2014. In July 2015, he averaged 16 per inning. He also began varying his pitches more that season, relying much less on the fastball, and more on a changeup and slider.

Siegrist earned his first major league save by pitching the last two innings of a 6−1 win against the Cincinnati Reds on April 17. In  innings into July, he struck out 49 batters. He had 15 holds, which ranked fourth in the National League (in July), to go with a 1.41 ERA and 1.10 WHIP. He made 80th appearance of the season against the Pittsburgh Pirates on September 30 in an 11–1 win and the club's 100th of season, became just the third left-handed pitcher in franchise history to make that many appearances in a season. He led the major leagues in appearances with 81.

Continuing in the role as a setup reliever in 2016, Siegrist went on the DL on June 30 due to mononucleosis. To that point, he was tied for first in victories among NL relievers at 5−2. Further, in 35 appearances, he posted a 2.78 ERA and one save and 34 strikeouts in  IP. He returned from the DL on July 15. Siegrist suffered through a variety of injuries in 2017. On August 31, 2017, Siegrist was designated for assignment.

Philadelphia Phillies 
The Philadelphia Phillies claimed Siegrist off waivers on September 2, 2017. He made his Phillies debut on September 4.

Pittsburgh Pirates
On February 24, 2018, Siegrist signed a minor league contract with the Pittsburgh Pirates. He was assigned to AAA Indianapolis Indians for the 2018 season but refused to report and was placed on the restricted list. He was released on October 2, 2018.

Charleston Dirty Birds
On July 2, 2022, Siegrist signed with the Charleston Dirty Birds of the Atlantic League of Professional Baseball.

Pitching profile
Three primary pitches compose Siegrist's arsenal. He throws a fastball, circle changeup and a slider. All three of his pitches result in high numbers of fly balls and his breaking balls are deceptive to hitters. He also mixes in a curveball, but this is rare as he had thrown it just five times through July in the 2015 season.

Awards
 Topps' Midwest League Player of the Month, May 2011
 Scout.com/Cardinal Nation Top Cardinals Prospect #22, 2013
 Cardinals Player of the Month, May 2013

See also

 St. Louis Cardinals all-time roster

References

External links

Siegrist player profile page at stlcardinals.scout.com

1989 births
Living people
Baseball players from Buffalo, New York
Baseball players from Florida
Sportspeople from the Miami metropolitan area
People from Wellington, Florida
Major League Baseball pitchers
St. Louis Cardinals players
Philadelphia Phillies players
Gulf Coast Cardinals players
Batavia Muckdogs players
Johnson City Cardinals players
Quad Cities River Bandits players
Palm Beach Cardinals players
Springfield Cardinals players
Surprise Saguaros players
Memphis Redbirds players
Palm Beach State Panthers baseball players